Frankfort is a village in Will County, Illinois, United States, with a small portion in Cook County. Per the 2020 census, the population was 20,296. According to Forbes.com, in 2007 the village ranked as the 36th fastest growing suburb in the United States. Frankfort is a suburb of Chicago. The Village is home to a park called Commissioners Park and some schools like Lincoln-Way East High School and Dr. Julian Rogus School.

Name 

The name "Frankfort" was taken from Frankfort Township designated by the governing board of Will County. It was commonly known as "Frankfort Station" after the opening of the Joliet & Northern Indiana Railroad through the township in 1855, though the official plat of the community dated March 1855 shows the name as "Frankfort". Property deed abstracts and railroad documents also show that the name was always Frankfort. Local residents incorporated Frankfort as a village in 1879. It also has some reference to the major German city of Frankfurt.

History 

First inhabited by Native Americans, including the Potawatomi and Sac and Fox tribes, Frankfort was used as a conduit between the Des Plaines and St. Joseph rivers. Originally, the area was part of the Virginia Territory before the French signed a treaty with Manitoqua, the Potawatomi chief, for land in the Prestwick area. The first pioneers came to Frankfort in the early 1830s by means of the Des Plaines River from the southwest and by wagon from the east along the Sauk Trail, a roadway that still exists today.

William Rice, the first non-native settler, made a permanent settlement in Frankfort in 1831. While the first pioneers, coming mainly from the New England colonies, were mostly of English and Scottish descent, German settlers made the village of Frankfort a reality. Later in the 1840s German settlers migrated from Germany to Frankfort. They had fled harsh conditions in their homeland by coming to America and proved to be very industrious and experienced farmers as they soon bought most of the fertile farm land from the "Yankees", who were more inclined to provide services for local needs. Establishing both ownership and pride in the area, the German settlers implemented the first system of resident concern for local lands, which has been maintained ever since.

What is now known as Frankfort Township was originally part of the Hickory Creek Precinct. Will County was originally divided into ten precincts. The county, in 1850, was changed to the township form of government. Frankfort Township was named by Frederick Cappel after his native city, Frankfurt am Main, Germany. In 1855 the Joliet and Northern Indiana Railroad built a line through an area linking Joliet, Illinois, with Lake Station, Indiana. The J&NI Railroad was leased to the Michigan Central Railroad, and service was implemented in July 1855. It was commonly referred to as "Frankfort Station" because of the railroad depot located there.

John McDonald became the first railroad agent in 1857.

In 1879, the village of Frankfort was incorporated, and elected John McDonald as the first Village President. Along with the establishment of the government, among the first undertakings of the newly formed administration was the institution of land use policies. Early plats that were recorded indicated a traditional grid pattern with residential uses surrounding the business district and railroad line and additional land provided for schools and public open spaces.

Geography
Frankfort is located at  (41.498133, -87.849549).

According to the 2021 census gazetteer files, Frankfort has a total area of ,all land.

An unincorporated area north of the village of Frankfort (in Frankfort Township) is a census-designated place known as Frankfort Square.

The Village is bordering Richton Park to the east, Tinley Park, Frankfort Square and Matteson to the northeast, Mokena and New Lenox to the west and Monee and University Park to the southeast.

Demographics
As of the 2020 census there were 20,296 people, 6,072 households, and 5,305 families residing in the village. The racial makeup of the village was 80.96% White, 8.65% African American, 0.13% Native American, 3.25% Asian, 0.01% Pacific Islander, 1.30% from other races, and 5.70% from two or more races. Hispanic or Latino of any race were 5.38% of the population.

There were 6,072 households, out of which 90.04% had children under the age of 18 living with them, 79.83% were married couples living together, 5.58% had a female householder with no husband present, and 12.63% were non-families. 12.48% of all households were made up of individuals, and 6.88% had someone living alone who was 65 years of age or older. The average household size was 3.42 and the average family size was 3.13.

The village's age distribution consisted of 29.7% under the age of 18, 6.6% from 18 to 24, 16.7% from 25 to 44, 30.7% from 45 to 64, and 16.3% who were 65 years of age or older. The median age was 41.9 years. For every 100 females, there were 96.4 males. For every 100 females age 18 and over, there were 95.5 males.

The median income for a household in the village was $140,731, and the median income for a family was $151,518. Males had a median income of $86,382 versus $52,719 for females. The per capita income for the village was $51,278. About 2.3% of families and 2.6% of the population were below the poverty line, including 3.1% of those under age 18 and 1.2% of those age 65 or over.

Note: the US Census treats Hispanic/Latino as an ethnic category. This table excludes Latinos from the racial categories and assigns them to a separate category. Hispanics/Latinos can be of any race.

Government
Frankfort is divided between two congressional districts. Most of the village is in Illinois's 1st congressional district, while the small portion in Cook County is in the 2nd district.

Transportation
Frankfort does not have any station but it has some major roads.

 (La Grange Road) major north-south Thoroughfare 
 (Lincoln Highway) major east-west Thoroughfare 
 (Laraway Road) near and on the southern corner of Frankfort 

Frankfort also does not have a Interstate Highway in it.

Education
Frankfort School District 157C and Summit Hill District 161 serve residents of Frankfort. As of 2018 the former district's middle school "Hickory Creek" is ranked 5th in the state.

Frankfort is home to Lincoln-Way East High School.  Lincoln-Way East High School has won state championships in Football (2005, 2017, 2019), Girls Softball (2002), Boys Gymnastics (2006, 2011), Girls Track & Field (2014, 2015, 2016), Girls Cheerleading (2014, 2015, 2017), Summer League Baseball, and Marching Band (2007, 2008).  Lincoln-Way North has a state championship in Boys Gymnastics (2011) and Summer League Baseball (2011).

Notable residents
Nick Allegretti, Super Bowl LIV Champion and Guard for the Kansas City Chiefs 
Lou Boudreau, Hall of Fame baseball player
Dennis DeYoung, former lead singer of the rock band Styx.
Jason Vander Laan, Current football tight end playing for the Carolina Panthers
Erika Lauren, member of MTVs The Real World: D.C. cast and former radio personality on The Alan Cox Show WMMS (100.7 FM) in Cleveland, Ohio.
 George E. Sangmeister (1931–2007), member of the United States House of Representatives from Illinois. He was a childhood resident of Frankfort, where his father was the Mayor.

References

External links

Village website
Frankfort local news

Villages in Will County, Illinois
Villages in Cook County, Illinois
Populated places established in 1879
1879 establishments in Illinois